Nikolai Stepanovich Chernykh (6 October 1931 – 25 May 2004) was a Russian-born Soviet astronomer and discoverer of minor planets and comets at the Crimean Astrophysical Observatory in Nauchnyy, Crimea.

Biography and work 

Chernykh was born in the Russian city of Usman in Voronezh Oblast, in present-day Lipetsk Oblast. He specialized in astrometry and the dynamics of small bodies in the Solar System and worked at the Crimean Astrophysical Observatory from 1963.

Chernykh discovered two periodic comets 74P/Smirnova–Chernykh and 101P/Chernykh. He also discovered a very large number of asteroids, including notably 2867 Šteins and the Trojan asteroid 2207 Antenor. Chernykh worked with his wife and colleague Lyudmila Chernykh. The asteroid 2325 Chernykh discovered in 1979 by Czech astronomer Antonín Mrkos was named in their honour.

List of discovered minor planets

References

External links 
   - An appreciation of the Work of N. S. Chernykh (in Russian)

1931 births
2004 deaths
People from Usman, Russia
Soviet astronomers
Discoverers of asteroids
Discoverers of comets